Karenin is a surname. Notable people with the surname include:

 Anna Karenina, fictitious heroine of Anna Karenina
 Anna Kareninová (born 1954), Czech translator